Yoo-jung, also spelled Yoo-jeong, or Yu-jeong, Yu-jeong, is a Korean feminine given name. Its meaning differs based on the hanja used to write each syllable of the name. There are 66 hanja with the reading "yoo" and 77 hanja with the reading "jung" on the South Korean government's official list of hanja which may be used in given names.

People with this name include:

Actresses
Ye Ji-won (born Lee Yoo-jung, 1973), South Korean actress
Choi Yoo-jung (actress) (born 1976), South Korean actress
Song Yoo-jung (1994–2021), South Korean actress
Kim Yoo-jung (born 1999), South Korean actress

Singers
May (singer) (born Bang Yu-jeong, 1982), South Korean female singer
Choi Yoo-jung (singer) (born 1999), South Korean female singer, member of girl groups I.O.I and Weki Meki

Other
Yujeong (1544–1610), religious name of Samyeongdang, Joseon-era Buddhist monk
Gim Yujeong (1908–1937), Korean male novelist of the Japanese colonial period
Jung Yoo-jung (born 1966), South Korean female novelist
Chae Yoo-jung (born 1995), South Korean female badminton player
Choi Yu-jung (ice hockey), South Korean female ice hockey player

Fictional characters
Lee Yoo-jeong, female character in 2008 South Korean film Night and Day, portrayed by Park Eun-hye
Moon Yu-jeong, female character in 2006 South Korean film Maundy Thursday, portrayed by Lee Na-young

See also
List of Korean given names

References

Korean feminine given names
Korean unisex given names